Radio daytime drama serials were broadcast for decades, and some expanded to television. These dramas are often referred to as "soaps", a shortening from  "soap opera". That term stems from the original dramatic serials broadcast on radio that had soap manufacturers such as Procter & Gamble, Colgate-Palmolive, and Lever Brothers as sponsors  and producers. These early radio serials were broadcast in weekday daytime slots when mostly housewives would be able to listen; thus the shows were aimed at and consumed by a predominantly female audience.

References

Soap
American radio soap operas
Radio-related lists